The 2014 Egypt Cup Final decided the winner of the 2014 Egypt Cup, the 81st season of Egypt's premier football cup. It was played on 19 July 2014 at the 30 June Stadium in Cairo 

In the final, Zamalek played Smouha. The winner would have earned a place in the Group Stage of the 2015 CAF Confederation Cup, but both teams were qualified for the Confederation Cup and Champions League via their league position.

Zamalek were the defending champions, and it was their 36th final and the third in a row, It was Smouha's first final, Zamalek won the game 1–0, claiming the cup for the 23rd time.

Route to the final

Game description

Match details

References

External links 

2014
Cup Final
EC 2014
EC 2014